The 2012 Women's Four Nations Hockey Tournament was a women's field hockey tournament, consisting of a series of test matches. It was held in Córdoba, Argentina, from January 18 to 22, 2012, and featured four of the top nations in women's field hockey.

Competition format
The tournament featured the national teams of Great Britain, New Zealand, South Korea, and the hosts, Argentina, competing in a round-robin format, with each team playing each other once. Three points were awarded for a win, one for a draw, and none for a loss.

Officials
The following umpires were appointed by the International Hockey Federation to officiate the tournament:

 Amy Hassick (USA)
 Kang Hyun-Hee (KOR)
 Aleesha Unka (NZL)
 Mariana Reydo (ARG)
 Sarah Wilson (GBR)

Results
All times are local (Argentina Standard Time).

Preliminary round

Fixtures

Classification round

Third and fourth place

Final

Awards
The following awards were presented at the conclusion of the tournament:

Statistics

Final standings

Goalscorers

References

External links
Official website

2012 in women's field hockey
hockey
International women's field hockey competitions hosted by Argentina
Sport in Córdoba, Argentina
February 2012 sports events in South America